Sound Venture is a jazz album recorded by Georgie Fame and the Harry South Big Band in 1966. Featuring many of Britain's top jazz musicians, and arranged by big band arranger Harry South, it marked a departure from Fame's R&B hits with the Blue Flames. The record peaked at number 9 on the national albums chart in the UK.

The album includes cover versions of songs by King Curtis and James Brown, as well as compositions written by Fame (credited under his real name, Clive Powell). While its commercial performance paled against his previous releases, Sound Venture earned Fame artistic credibility and resulted in a joint tour with American jazz musician Count Basie.

Elvis Costello, in a 1999 interview for Mojo magazine, described the impact the album made on him:
In 1966 I was 12 and already a big Georgie Fame fan. I'd got Yeh Yeh and Getaway and In The Meantime and I loved the Fame At Last EP. I saved up for a few weeks to buy Sound Venture … It was such a hip record. Apart from anything else it had such a great title! And Georgie plays killer organ. I'd been used to the sound of the big band but this was different. There was no strict dance tempo and it wasn't smooth like Joe Loss – this was a swinging band and the line-up was a who's who of the jazz scene. It had a huge impact on me because the songs were all over the place from James Brown to Willie Nelson. He was one of the first British R&B artists to discover James Brown, which was a big deal then because the only pop we heard was Brian Matthew four hours a week on the radio – the rest of the time it was tea-dance music, the Palm Court orchestra and Geraldo. There was no way we could have any personal knowledge of those original artists – and if we did the records were too expensive and I was too young to go to clubs to see them. Every record changes you a little, but Sound Venture knocked a wall down for me.

Track listing 

"Many Happy Returns" (Norman "Hurricane" Smith)
"Down for the Count" (Jon Hendricks, Dave Lambert, Freddie Green)
"It's for Love the Petals Fall" (Jack Ashford)
"I Am Missing You" (Clive Powell)
"Funny How Time Slips Away" (Willie Nelson)
"Lil' Pony" (Neal Hefti, Hendricks)
"Lovey Dovey" (King Curtis, Ahmet Ertegün)
"Lil' Darlin'" (Hefti, Hendricks)
"Three Blind Mice" (Hendricks)
"Dawn Yawn" (Powell)
"Feed Me" (Hendricks)
"Papa's Got a Brand New Bag" (James Brown)

Personnel 
Musicians
Georgie Fame – vocals, keyboards
Tubby Hayes – saxophone
Ronnie Scott – tenor saxophone
Alan Branscombe – saxophone
Tony Coe – saxophone
Harry Klein – saxophone
Dick Morrissey – tenor saxophone
Jackie Sharp – saxophone
Ray Warleigh – saxophone
Ray Wilcox – saxophone
Kenny Wheeler – trumpet
Jimmy Deuchar – trumpet
Bert Courtley – trumpet
Tony Fisher – trumpet
Ian Hamer – trumpet
Keith Christie – trombone
Ken Goldie – trombone
Phil Seamen – drums
Bill Eyden – drums
Phil Bates – bass
Colin Green – guitar
Stan Tracey – keyboards
Harry South – arranger, conductor

Other credits
Denny Cordell – producer
Tony Palmer – producer
Chris Welch – sleevenotes
Dave Redfern – photographs

References 

1966 albums
Albums produced by Denny Cordell
Columbia Records albums
Georgie Fame albums
Albums conducted by Harry South
Albums arranged by Harry South